Paucartambo (from Quechua: Pawqar Tampu, meaning "colored tambo") is a town in Southern Peru, capital of the province Paucartambo in the region Cusco. Paucartambo is home to the colourful Virgen del Carmen festival (Our Lady of Mount Carmel), held each 16 July. Paucartambo's three-day Fiesta de la Virgen del Carmen is one of the biggest street parties in Peru, and attracts tens of thousands of travellers, almost all Peruvian, each year.

See also 
 Chukchu
 Ch'unchu
 Qhapaq negro
 Qhapaq Qulla
 Saqra

References

External links
Satellite map at Maplandia

Populated places in the Cusco Region